Thermacetogenium phaeum is a bacterium, the type species of its genus. It is strictly anaerobic, thermophilic, syntrophic and acetate-oxidizing. Its cells are gram-positive, endospore-forming and rod-shaped. Its type strain is PBT (= DSM 12270T). It has a potential biotechnological role.

References

Further reading

Staley, James T., et al. "Bergey's manual of systematic bacteriology, vol. 3."Williams and Wilkins, Baltimore, MD (1989): 2250–2251.

External links 

LPSN
Type strain of Thermacetogenium phaeum at BacDive -  the Bacterial Diversity Metadatabase

Thermoanaerobacterales
Thermophiles
Anaerobes
Bacteria described in 2000